Harriette Walters (born c. 1956) is a former civil servant who worked as a tax assessments manager for the District of Columbia. She was convicted of being the central participant in the largest fraud scheme ever perpetrated by a District of Columbia government official. According to those officials, she worked with others to fraudulently approve over $31 million in improper tax refunds, with some estimates nearing $50 million.  In her office, she was referred to as "Mother Walters" for the loans and extravagant gifts with which she would shower her fellow employees and friends.  Walters was arrested in November 2007.

From the Washington Examiner (June 30, 2009): 'Self-confessed tax scam mastermind Harriette Walters was led off to prison Tuesday, but not before warning a federal judge that the District's finance office is still dangerously exposed to another massive rip-off. "'If you let me into my office, I guarantee I could get each of you a check', Walters told prosecutors and federal Judge Emmet Sullivan before he sentenced her to 17-and-a-half years in prison."

The fraud scheme of Harriette Walters has been the subject of academic and professional publications. Jacoby, Loringo, and McCallum describe the mechanics of the fraud scheme together with some informative analytics looking at the amounts over time. The authors then review the importance of internal controls and also review the control activity deficiencies that allowed the proceeds of the fraud scheme to exceed $48 million.

Walters was released from prison after serving more than 14 years on January 13, 2022.

References

External links
Bureau of Prisons locator
Washington Post article, November 17, 2007
Washington Post article
Washington Post article, February 20, 2008
Washington Post article, September 17, 2008
"Tax Scam Leader Gets More Than 17 Years", Washington Post article, July 1, 2009

Living people
Year of birth missing (living people)